Mulberry Gap is an unincorporated community in northwestern Hancock County, Tennessee, along SR 63. This community is unincorporated.

References

Unincorporated communities in Hancock County, Tennessee